"A Week in a Country Jail" is a song written and recorded by American country music artist Tom T. Hall. It was released in November 1969 as the third and final single from his 1969 studio album Homecoming. The song was Hall's fifth release to reach the U.S. country singles chart and the first of seven number-ones.  "A Week in a Country Jail" stayed at the top for two weeks and spent a total of thirteen weeks on the chart.

Content 
The song begins with the protagonist being arrested for speeding while standing on red at traffic lights. He spends the night in a jail cell, being served hot bologna, eggs and gravy and, during his prolonged stay, becomes interested in the jailer's wife. After seven days, the inmate is finally lectured on traffic laws by the judge who takes "every nickel he had" and releases him.

Chart performance

References 

1969 singles
Tom T. Hall songs
Songs written by Tom T. Hall
Song recordings produced by Jerry Kennedy
1969 songs
Mercury Records singles
Songs about prison